Count Nikolai Ilyich Rostov (Nikolaj Il'ič Rostov) is a character in Leo Tolstoy's 1869 novel War and Peace.

Count Nikolai is the brother of Vera Rostova, Natasha Rostova and Petya Rostov. At the start of the novel, Nikolai is aged 20 and a university student. He gives up his studies in a zealous desire to serve his country as a Hussar in the fight against Napoleon's French invading forces. He dreams of manly success and glory in battle, although these dreams are somewhat undermined after he falls and is injured in the Battle of Schöngrabern. Nikolai is initially easily influenced and acts out of emotional responses; unlike his childhood friend, the social climber Boris Drubetskoy, who writer Dimitri Pisarev regarded "as the complete antithesis".

He refuses to use his family's contacts to improve his rank in the army, and comes under the influence of the libertine Dolokhov, losing large amounts of money to him at cards. Nikolai promises to marry his cousin Sonya but on his first leave home he pays no attention to her, and regularly goes to visit a courtesan. When Nikolai's friend Dolokhov proposes to Sonya and is rejected, Nikolai is easily led to financial ruin and social humiliation by Dolokhov, who manipulates him into again losing 43,000 Rubles at cards. Later, Sonya releases Nikolai from his promise to marry her. The book ends with his successful marriage to Maria Bolkonskaya and the couple's close friendship with Natasha and Pierre Bezukhov. Also, Nikolai's mother and Sonya live with him and his family at Bald Hills.

See also 
List of characters in War and Peace

References

External links
"Nikolai Rostov (Character) from War and Peace (1956)," The Internet Movie Database

Fictional counts and countesses
Characters in War and Peace
Fictional Russian people in literature
Male characters in literature
Literary characters introduced in 1869
Hussars